Süzen v Zehnacker Gebäudereinigung GmbH (1997) C-13/95 is a European Union labour law case concerning transfers of undertakings, and the job security rights of employees.

Facts
Ms Süzen worked for a Zehnacker, a cleaning company in a private school of Bad Godesberg. Zehnacker lost the cleaning contract. Lefarth won the bid to take it over. Zehnacker let her go, along with 12 others. She stayed working the same as before.

Judgment
The European Court of Justice held that the lack of any contractual link between transferee and transferor ‘is certainly not conclusive’. That is so because the Directive does not require it. The ‘transfer must relate to a stable economic entity whose activity is not limited to performing one specific works contract’ (Case C-48/94 Rygaard [1995] ECR I-2745, paragraph 20) and an entity is ‘an organized grouping of persons and assets facilitating the exercise of an economic activity which pursues a specific objective’.

The ECJ further held that the loss of a customer does not mean that the undertaking will ‘thereby cease fully to exist’. Where an entity can ‘function without any significant intangible or tangible assets, the maintenance of its identity following the transaction affecting it cannot, logically, depend on the transfer of such assets.’

See also

Notes

References

1997 in the European Union
German case law
1997 in Germany
1997 in case law
Court of Justice of the European Union case law
European Union labour case law